, also known as Asako Takakura-Takemoto or Asako Takemoto due to her marriage, is a Japanese football manager and former player. She played for Japan national team. She is a former manager of the Japan national team. Her husband is former footballer Kazuhiko Takemoto.

Club career
Takakura was born in Fukushima on 19 April 1968. In 1981, she joined FC Jinnan. In 1985, she moved to Yomiuri Beleza. The club won L.League title for 4 years in a row (1990–1993). She was selected MVP awards in 1992 and 1993 season. She was also selected Best Eleven 7 times (1989, 1991, 1992, 1993, 1994, 1997 and 1998). In 1999, her husband Kazuhiko Takemoto moved to Gamba Osaka. So, she moved to Matsushita Electric Panasonic Bambina (later Speranza FC Takatsuki) based in Osaka. In 2000, she moved to Women's Premier Soccer League club Silicon Valley Red Devils. In 2001, she returned to Speranza FC Takatsuki. End of 2004 season, she retired from playing career. She played 226 games in L.League.

International career
On 17 October 1984, when Takakura was 16 years old, she debuted for Japan national team against Italy. She played at 1986, 1989, 1991, 1993, 1995, 1999 AFC Championship, 1990 and 1994 Asian Games. She was also a member of Japan for 1991, 1995 World Cup and 1996 Summer Olympics. She played 79 games and scored 29 goals for Japan until 1999.

Managerial career
Takakura started her coaching career as an assistant coach of the Japan U-17 national team at the 2009 and 2011 AFC U-16 Championships. As manager of the Japan U-17 team, she led the youth team to the title of the 2013 AFC U-16 Championship by winning over North Korea in the final. Next year, she led to the title of the 2014 U-17 World Cup by winning over Spain in the final. She repeated the achievement by mentoring the Japan U-20 national team to help them win the title of the 2015 AFC U-19 Championship, again by defeating North Korea in the final.

On 27 April 2016, Takakura was appointed as the manager of the Japan senior national team becoming the first female to hold the post. She was also appointed as manager of the Japan U-20 team and won 3rd place at 2016 U-20 World Cup. In 2018, she led to the title of 2018 Asian Cup.

Takakura has been given the AFC Women's Coach Of The Year Award Six times; in 2012, 2013, 2014, 2015, 2017 and 2018.

International statistics

International goals

References

External links

1968 births
Living people
Wako University alumni
Association football people from Fukushima Prefecture
Japanese women's footballers
Japan women's international footballers
Nadeshiko League players
Nippon TV Tokyo Verdy Beleza players
Speranza Osaka-Takatsuki players
Japanese women's football managers
Japan women's national football team managers
Asian Games medalists in football
Footballers at the 1990 Asian Games
Footballers at the 1994 Asian Games
1991 FIFA Women's World Cup players
1995 FIFA Women's World Cup players
Olympic footballers of Japan
Footballers at the 1996 Summer Olympics
Women's association football midfielders
Asian Games silver medalists for Japan
Medalists at the 1990 Asian Games
Medalists at the 1994 Asian Games
2019 FIFA Women's World Cup managers
Female association football managers
Nadeshiko League MVPs